Seong-ja, also spelled Sung-ja,  is a Korean feminine given name. The meaning differs based on the hanja used to write each syllable of the name. There are 27 hanja with the reading "seong" and 28 hanja with the reading "ja" on the South Korean government's official list of hanja which may be used in given names. Typically, "ja" is written with the hanja meaning "child". Names ending with this hanja, such as Young-ja and Jeong-ja, were popular when Korea was under Japanese rule, but declined in popularity afterwards. The hanja used to write the name Seong-ja also correspond to a number of different Japanese given names; for example, both  and  can be read as the name Seiko.

People with this name include:

Seund Ja Rhee (1918–2009), South Korean expatriate artist in France
Shin Seong-Ja (born 1968), South Korean fencer
Park Sung-Ja (born 1980), South Korean judo practitioner

See also
List of Korean given names

References

Korean feminine given names